Coublanc may refer to:

Coublanc, Haute-Marne, a commune in the French region of Champagne-Ardenne
Coublanc, Saône-et-Loire a commune in the French region of Bourgogne